América is a community located in Nuevo Laredo Municipality in the Mexican state of Tamaulipas. According to the INEGI Census of 2010, América has a population of 197 inhabitants.  Its elevation is 135 meters above sea level. It is the second locality of the same name in the municipality, the other is América, which lies just to the west, across Mexican Federal Highway 85.

See also
América, Tamaulipas

References 

Populated places in Tamaulipas
Laredo–Nuevo Laredo